Nicholas Kipkorir may refer to:

Nicholas Chelimo Kipkorir (born 1983), Kenyan marathon runner
Nicholas Kipkorir Kimeli (born 1998), Kenyan distance track runner

See also
Kipkorir